During the COVID-19 pandemic in Vietnam,  colluded with government officials to sell COVID-19 RT-PCR tests, and later imported rapid tests falsely marketed as locally made, at a heavy markup to provincial health departments and hospitals through 2020 and 2021. The discovery of this corruption in late 2021 led to a number of prominent officials being dismissed, including Nguyễn Thanh Long, who had been health minister for most of the pandemic, and reduced public trust in the government.

Background
 was considered one of the most prominent companies in the Vietnamese medical technology sector and a major supplier of chemicals and machines for the country's hospitals. However, the high amount spent on mass testing, four times the expenses incurred by Vietnam to supply COVID-19 vaccines, had resulted in some suspecting collusion between the government and private companies for the latter's gain.

With nearly 1,400 officials being investigated by the government through this campaign according to official figures, this has been described as the farthest-reaching anti-corruption effort by the CPV; on the other hand, some commentators have accused Trọng of merely targeting political opponents (such as politicians who were allied with former prime minister Nguyễn Tấn Dũng), and there has been criticism of the campaign for failing to significantly reduce corruption.

Scandal
The first controversy occurred in April 2020, when the Ministry of Science and Technology claimed that the test had been accepted by the World Health Organization (WHO) for emergency use, despite this not being the case. Although social media users suspected it was a false claim to increase sales and public trust, it took months for the press and the WHO to refute these claims, which led to additional criticism for the slow response. It was later found that the RT-PCR tests were marked up by 45% and sold at a price of US$20. Furthermore, between September and December 2021, Việt Á imported rapid test kits from China at the price of US$0.955, falsely marketed them as being made in Vietnam, and sold them to local officials for US$20.75, 21.7 times the original price. To facilitate these markups, the company admitted to having bribed local officials over US$35 million in total to buy the test kits,  earning a revenue surpassing $US177 million with an illegitimate profit of $22 million.

Response
After these events were made public in December 2021, the Vietnamese government launched an investigation, arresting key Việt Á executives and leaders as well as looking at the roles of provincial health officials. By June 2022, dozens of politicians were arrested and charged, including health minister Nguyễn Thanh Long and Hanoi mayor , who were also stripped of their Communist Party membership and thus dismissed from office. The scandal reportedly undermined public trust in the government and its COVID-19 policies; some commentators also saw the response as scapegoating and a band-aid solution to structural problems.

See also 

 Corruption in Vietnam
 Crime in Vietnam

References

Scandals in Vietnam
COVID-19 pandemic in Vietnam